Nathan Eldon Tanner (May 9, 1898 – November 27, 1982) was a politician from Alberta, Canada, and a leader of the Church of Jesus Christ of Latter-day Saints (LDS Church). He served in the Legislative Assembly of Alberta from 1935 to 1952 as a member of the Social Credit caucus in government.  He served as Speaker of the Legislative Assembly from 1936 to 1937 and as a cabinet minister in the governments of William Aberhart and Ernest Manning from 1937 to 1952, in various portfolios related to resource industries.

Early life
Tanner was born on May 9, 1898, in Salt Lake City, Utah, to Nathan William Tanner and Sarah Edna Brown Tanner. He had seven younger siblings. His family emigrated to Canada and had a farmstead in Aetna, south of Cardston, Alberta, where he grew up and attended grade school. He attended high school at Knight Academy in Raymond and received some postsecondary education at Calgary Normal School.

Tanner began his working life at a grocery store and butcher shop. He obtained a job teaching at a small school in Hill Spring in 1919. He met Sara Isabelle Merrill at the school and married her on December 20, 1919 and they became the parents of five daughters.

Along with teaching, Tanner also established his own general store, which later also became the local post office, to supplement his family income. The store was successful enough that he left his first teaching job in Hill Spring to run the store full-time.

Tanner eventually became a high school teacher and school principal in Cardston. He got his start in politics as a councillor on the Cardston Town Council.

Political career
Tanner was drafted to run for a seat to the Legislative Assembly of Alberta for the first time in the 1935 general election. He ran as a Social Credit candidate in the electoral district of Cardston and defeated the incumbent United Farmers MLA George Stringam.

After the election and despite his complete lack of parliamentary experience, Tanner was chosen to be Speaker of the Alberta Legislature when the first session of the 8th Alberta Legislative Assembly began. He served in that role until January 5, 1937, when Premier William Aberhart appointed Tanner the Minister of Lands and Mines. His time in this capacity and as legislator spanned 16 years.

In the 1940 general election, Tanner defeated the independent candidate S.H. Nelson in a two-way race.

In the 1944 general election, Tanner won a three-way race.

In the 1948 Alberta general election, Tanner easily won a two-way race over the Liberal candidate Briant Stringam to hold his seat.

In 1949, Ernest Manning changed Tanner's ministerial portfolio from Lands and Mines to Lands and Forests. Tanner was also appointed Minister of Mines and Minerals and held both portfolios until his retirement from the Legislature at its dissolution in 1952.

LDS Church
In 1960, Tanner was called as an Assistant to the Quorum of the Twelve Apostles, a full-time LDS Church general authority. He had previous experience in church leadership, having served as a bishop, branch president, and stake president in Canada. In the church, he preferred to be referred to as "N. Eldon Tanner." In 1962, the death of George Q. Morris created a vacancy in the Quorum of the Twelve Apostles, which Tanner was called to fill in October 1962. He was still the quorum's junior member one year later when he was called into the First Presidency as second counselor to church president David O. McKay. Tanner remained in that position for the church presidency of Joseph Fielding Smith (1970–1972) and then became first counselor to Smith's successor, Harold B. Lee and later to Spencer W. Kimball until Tanner's death. He thus served as counselor to four church presidents. While Tanner was a member of the First Presidency, the membership numbers of the church grew from 1.7 million to 5 million.

Tanner was presented with the American Academy of Achievement’s Golden Plate Award at a ceremony in 1972 at Salt Lake City.

As the First Presidency, Kimball, Tanner, and Marion G. Romney announced the reception of the Revelation on Priesthood in June 1978, which established that being of black African descent would no longer be a barrier to ordination to the church's priesthood. The announcement was canonized as "Official Declaration 2" in the church's Doctrine and Covenants. Tanner formally presented the announcement for acceptance by the church at a general conference in October 1978.

Not long afterward, Tanner's health deteriorated, and it became impossible for him to continue the duties of his office. Kimball and Romney were also ailing, and the decision was made to add Gordon B. Hinckley as an additional counselor to the First Presidency on July 23, 1981, with Neal A. Maxwell ordained to take Hinckley's seat in the Quorum of the Twelve Apostles. Tanner remained first counselor until his death on November 27, 1982, at the age of 84. Because of the appointments of Maxwell and Hinckley the prior year, no additional individuals were added to the First Presidency and no apostles were ordained as a result of his death.

Notes

References
"President N. Eldon Tanner Dies", Engisn, January 1983.

External links
Legislative Assembly of Alberta Members Listing
General Authorities and General Officers: Elder Nathan Eldon Tanner
 BYU: Nathan Eldon Tanner

1898 births
1982 deaths
20th-century Canadian politicians
Alberta Social Credit Party MLAs
American emigrants to Canada
American general authorities (LDS Church)
Apostles (LDS Church)
Assistants to the Quorum of the Twelve Apostles
Canadian general authorities (LDS Church)
Counselors in the First Presidency (LDS Church)
Doctrine and Covenants people
Members of the Executive Council of Alberta
People from Cardston County
Speakers of the Legislative Assembly of Alberta
Tanner family
Harold B. Lee Library-related University Archives articles